It's Pony is a British animated television series created by Ant Blades that premiered on Nickelodeon in the United States on January 18, 2020. The series is storyboarded, designed, produced, and animated by Blue-Zoo Animation.

Premise
It's Pony follows the life of Annie as she does her best to cope in her parents' farm (located on the balcony of their apartment) to the everyday struggles of being a 9-year-old in the city. Luckily, she has a pony. He may not be the best pony, but he is hers and she loves him. Pony adores her as well, but his optimism and enthusiasm often lead to the pair in unexpected and unwanted situations.

Characters

Main
 Annie (voiced by Jessica DiCicco)
 Pony (voiced by Josh Zuckerman)
 Dad (voiced by Abe Benrubi)
 Mom (voiced by India de Beaufort)

Supporting
 Fred (voiced by Kal Penn)
 Brian (voiced by Bobby Moynihan)
 Ms. Ramiro (voiced by Rosario Dawson)
 Mr. Pancks (voiced by Mark Feuerstein)
 Beatrice (voiced by Megan Hilty)

Production 
The series originated from a short titled Pony, created as part of the annual Nickelodeon Animated Shorts Program. On March 6, 2018, it was announced that Nickelodeon officially green-lit the series with a 20-episode order at Nickelodeon's 2018 upfront presentation. On December 9, 2019, it was announced that the series would premiere on January 18, 2020, with a teaser episode released online on December 26, 2019.

On July 9, 2020, the series was renewed for a second season of 20 episodes, which premiered on October 29, 2021.

Episodes

Series overview

Season 1 (2020)

Season 2 (2021–22)

Shorts

Reception

Ratings 
 

| link2             = #Season 2 (2021–22)
| episodes2         = 20
| start2            = 
| end2              = 
| startrating2      = 0.02
| endrating2        = 0.04
| viewers2          = |2}} 
}}

Awards and nominations

Notes

References

External links 
 
 

2020s British animated television series
2020s British children's television series
2020 British television series debuts
British children's animated adventure television series
British children's animated comedy television series
British flash animated television series
English-language television shows
Nickelodeon original programming
2020s Nickelodeon original programming
Animated television series about children
Animated television series about families
Animated television series about horses

2020s American animated television series
2020s American children's television series
2020 American television series debuts
American children's animated adventure television series
American children's animated comedy television series
Nicktoons